The Kraków-Kolna Canoe Slalom Course is an artificial whitewater course in Poland, on the south bank of the Vistula River, in the suburb of Kolna,  west of Krakow. It is fed with river water diverted around a nearby dam. The top  of the course is a flatwater start pool that is covered in winter by a long white tent. Air inside the tent is heated, but the water is cold.

This Olympic-standard slalom course is the site of frequent international competitions. In June 2013, it hosted the European Championships.  It is part of a larger complex called the Kolna Sports and Recreation Center (Ośrodek Sportu i Rekreacji „Kolna") which includes a canal for flatwater sprint canoeing and an indoor gymnasium and swimming pool.

Design
The concrete channel has a flat bottom and vertical sides. The flow diverters are two pairs of concrete wing dams and clusters of vertical blue and green plastic bollards attached to peg boards on the channel bottom.  A foot bridge across the channel joins the first pair of wing dams.

To modernize the course for the 2013 European Championships, the top section was made shorter and steeper by extending the length of the start pool.  This change entailed raising the channel walls  in the section above the foot bridge.  Work was completed in April 2013.

Gallery
European Canoe Slalom Championships, June 2013

References

Artificial whitewater courses
Buildings and structures in Kraków
Sports venues in Lesser Poland Voivodeship